Melindea nigrita is a species of leaf beetle. It is distributed in Ethiopia, Kenya, the Democratic Republic of the Congo, Uganda and Sudan. It was described by Martin Jacoby in 1901.

References 

Eumolpinae
Beetles of the Democratic Republic of the Congo
Insects of Ethiopia
Insects of Kenya
Insects of Uganda
Insects of Sudan
Taxa named by Martin Jacoby
Beetles described in 1901